Monte George Kiffin (born February 29, 1940) is an American football coach.  He is currently a player personnel analyst at Ole Miss for his son, Lane Kiffin. He is widely considered to be one of the preeminent defensive coordinators in modern football, as well as one of the greatest defensive coordinators in NFL history. Father of the widely imitated "Tampa 2" defense, Kiffin's concepts are among the most influential in modern college and pro football.

Before taking the role as Dallas Cowboys defensive coordinator, Kiffin served as assistant head coach for the University of Southern California where his son Lane Kiffin was named head coach on January 12, 2010, and before that he served under his son as the defensive coordinator at the University of Tennessee. Possibly due to the mounting pressure on his son's poor coaching records, on November 29, 2012, Kiffin resigned from his position to pursue other opportunities in the NFL. He previously served 26 years as an NFL assistant coach, including 13 years as defensive coordinator for the Tampa Bay Buccaneers, with whom he won Super Bowl XXXVII. His defensive units have finished ranked in the top 10 in points allowed and yards allowed 10 times during that period, an NFL record.

Kiffin was paid about $1.2 million per year by Tennessee. He earned a reported $2 million annual salary from the Buccaneers and has turned down several NFL head coaching jobs during his career. To this day, Kiffin's only head coaching job was at North Carolina State University from 1980 to 1982.

Career
A native of Lexington, Nebraska, Kiffin was an offensive and defensive tackle at the University of Nebraska–Lincoln from 1959 to 1963. In 1966, he played 8 games with the Toronto Rifles of the Continental Football League and also was a member of the Brooklyn Dodgers of the same league.  After a brief stint as a defensive end for the Winnipeg Blue Bombers, Kiffin returned to Nebraska as a defensive coach.  Kiffin was a defensive assistant at Nebraska under legendary coach, Bob Devaney. He coached the defenses of Nebraska's 1970 and 1971 back-to-back undefeated national champion teams under coordinator Lance Van Zant. After then offensive coordinator Tom Osborne was selected as the head coach in 1973, Monte was elevated to the defensive coordinator in 1974. In 1977, he moved to the University of Arkansas, and then in 1980, he got his one and only head coaching job at North Carolina State University.

After his time at NC State, Kiffin began a series of short stints in the NFL for the Green Bay Packers, Buffalo Bills, Minnesota Vikings (twice), New York Jets, and New Orleans Saints. In 1996, he became the defensive coordinator for the Buccaneers.

After Tony Dungy was dismissed by the Buccaneer front office following the 2001 season, Kiffin was persuaded by incoming head coach Jon Gruden to remain in Tampa and continue to run his defense. Kiffin had been interviewed for a head coaching position with the San Francisco 49ers. With the seamless transition on defense allowing the new coaching staff to focus intently on a more potent offensive philosophy, the result was an immediate balance between offense and defense that carried the Buccaneers to the organization's first championship in Super Bowl XXXVII on January 26, 2003 in San Diego, California.

Controversy has surrounded Kiffin's departure from Tampa Bay. After Lane Kiffin signed with Tennessee, Tampa's typically stout defense underperformed. The Bucs lost their final four games of the 2008 season, ending up 9–7, and missed the playoffs. Reports stated that Gruden refused to allow Kiffin to announce his departure to Tennessee mid-season. Allegations were made that Kiffin refused to participate in normal coaching meetings. Neither Kiffin nor Jon Gruden have openly discussed these events.

Monte joined the University of Southern California coaching staff as defensive coordinator, after his son Lane Kiffin became the head coach.

On January 11, 2013, following the 2012 NFL season, Kiffin was hired as defensive coordinator for the Dallas Cowboys. Kiffin was demoted on January 28, 2014 in favor of defensive line coach Rod Marinelli.  At the end of the 2014 season Kiffin's contract was allowed to lapse, and it was not renewed by the Cowboys.

Kiffin joined the Jacksonville Jaguars as a defensive assistant in March 2016.

Defensive philosophy

Monte Kiffin is the mastermind behind the Tampa 2 scheme, which is a slight modification of Tony Dungy's Cover 2. His defensive philosophy has several hallmarks.

 Speed over size and strength.  Coordinators that employ Kiffin-style defenses will often replace linebackers with safeties in order to put more speed on the field. In particular, linebackers must be able to cover receivers; in the Tampa 2 scheme, one linebacker frequently drops back deep into coverage, turning what looks like a Cover 2 defense into a Cover 3.  Kiffin's defenses also employ quick, penetrating defensive tackles.
 Preventing scores over preventing yardage.  A Kiffin coordinator doesn't care how many yards an offense gains, as long as the team doesn't score, an approach known as bend-but-don't-break.
 Multiple defenses from one look.  Kiffin-style defenses try to use the same personnel (or the same kind of personnel) at all times, so that the offense cannot adjust its play call based on the alignment of the defensive personnel.
 Attacking and causing turnovers.  Kiffin-style defenses focus on getting the ball away from the offense by stripping the ball away from the ball carrier or reading the quarterback to make an interception.  The risk is that if the ball is not stripped or intercepted, then the ball carrier on offense has a better chance of gaining more yards or scoring; the reward is that the offensive drive is stopped without a score more often, frequently giving good field position.

Personal life
Kiffin's sons are both football coaches. Elder son, Lane Kiffin, played football at Fresno State before entering coaching: becoming the head coach of the Oakland Raiders, Tennessee Volunteers, USC Trojans, and Florida Atlantic Owls, the offensive coordinator and quarterbacks coach for the Alabama Crimson Tide and is currently the head coach at the University of Mississippi. Younger son, Chris Kiffin, played football at Colorado State and is now the Linebackers Coach for the Houston Texans.

Head coaching record

References

Further reading

External links
 USC profile

1940 births
Living people
American football defensive linemen
American football offensive linemen
American players of Canadian football
Canadian football defensive linemen
Arkansas Razorbacks football coaches
Buffalo Bills coaches
Dallas Cowboys coaches
Florida Atlantic Owls football coaches
Green Bay Packers coaches
Jacksonville Jaguars coaches
Minnesota Vikings coaches
NC State Wolfpack football coaches
Nebraska Cornhuskers football players
New Orleans Saints coaches
New York Jets coaches
Ole Miss Rebels football coaches
Tampa Bay Buccaneers coaches
Tennessee Volunteers football coaches
USC Trojans football coaches
Winnipeg Blue Bombers players
Continental Football League players
People from Lexington, Nebraska
Players of American football from Nebraska